Dodecane (also known as dihexyl, bihexyl, adakane 12, or duodecane) is an oily liquid n-alkane hydrocarbon with the chemical formula C12H26 (which has 355 isomers).

It is used as a solvent, distillation chaser, and scintillator component. It is used as a diluent for tributyl phosphate (TBP) in nuclear reprocessing plants.

Combustion reaction
The combustion reaction of dodecane is as follows:

2 C12H26(l) + 37 O2(g) → 24 CO2(g) + 26 H2O(g)

ΔH° = −7513 kJ

One litre of fuel needs about 15 kg of air to burn, and generates 2.3 kg (or 1.2 m3) of CO2 upon complete combustion.

Jet fuel surrogate
In recent years, n-dodecane has garnered attention as a possible surrogate for kerosene-based fuels such as Jet-A, S-8, and other conventional aviation fuels. It is considered a second-generation fuel surrogate designed to emulate the laminar flame speed, largely supplanting n-decane, primarily due to its higher molecular mass and lower hydrogen-to-carbon ratio which better reflect the n-alkane content of jet fuels.

See also
Higher alkanes
Kerosene
List of isomers of dodecane

References

External links

Material Safety Data Sheet for Dodecane
Dodecane, Dr. Duke's Phytochemical and Ethnobotanical Databases

Alkanes
Hydrocarbon solvents